The United Kingdom of the Netherlands is the unofficial name given to the Kingdom of the Netherlands as it existed between 1815 and 1839. The United Netherlands was created in the aftermath of the Napoleonic Wars through the fusion of territories that had belonged to the former Dutch Republic, Austrian Netherlands, and Prince-Bishopric of Liège in order to form a buffer state between the major European powers. The polity was a constitutional monarchy, ruled by William I of the House of Orange-Nassau.

The polity collapsed in 1830 with the outbreak of the Belgian Revolution. With the de facto secession of Belgium, the Netherlands was left as a rump state and refused to recognise Belgian independence until 1839 when the Treaty of London was signed, fixing the border between the two states and guaranteeing Belgian independence and neutrality as the Kingdom of Belgium.

Background

Before the French Revolutionary Wars (1792–1802), the Low Countries was a patchwork of different polities created by the Eighty Years' War (1568–1648). The Dutch Republic in the north was independent; the Southern Netherlands was split between the Austrian Netherlands and the Prince-Bishopric of Liège - the former being part of Habsburg monarchy, while both were part of the Holy Roman Empire. In the aftermath of the French Revolution, the War of the First Coalition broke out in 1792 and France was invaded by Prussia and the Holy Roman Empire. After two years of fighting, the Austrian Netherlands and Liège were captured by the French in 1794 and annexed into France. The Dutch Republic collapsed in 1795 and became a French client state.

Creation of the United Netherlands

In 1813, the Netherlands was liberated from French rule by Prussian and Russian troops during the Napoleonic Wars. It was taken for granted that any new regime would have to be headed by the son of the last Dutch stadhouder, William Frederik of Orange-Nassau. A provisional government was formed, most of whose members had helped drive out the House of Orange 18 years earlier. However, they realised that it would be better in the long term to offer leadership of the new government to William Frederik themselves rather than have him imposed by the allies. Accordingly, William Frederick was installed as the "sovereign prince" of a new Sovereign Principality of the United Netherlands. The future of the Southern Netherlands, however, was less clear. In June 1814, the Great Powers secretly agreed to the Eight Articles of London which allocated the region to the Dutch as William had advocated. That August, William Frederik was made Governor-General of the Southern Netherlands and the Prince-Bishop of Liège, which combined are almost all of what is now Belgium. For all intents and purposes, William Frederik had completed his family's three-century dream of uniting the Low Countries under a single rule.

Discussions on the future of the region were still ongoing at the Congress of Vienna when Napoleon attempted to return to power in the "Hundred Days". William used the occasion to declare himself king on 16 March 1815 as William I. After the Battle of Waterloo, discussions continued.

In exchange for the Southern Netherlands, William agreed to cede the Principality of Orange-Nassau and parts of the Liège to Prussia on 31 May 1815. In exchange, William also gained control over the Duchy of Luxembourg, which was elevated to a grand duchy and placed in personal and political union with the Netherlands, though it remained part of the German Confederation.

Government

Constitution and government
Though the United Netherlands was a constitutional monarchy, the king retained significant control as head of state and head of government. Beneath the king was a bicameral legislature known as the States General with a Senate and House of Representatives.

From the start, the administrative system proved controversial. Representation in the 110-seat House of Representatives, for example, was divided equally between south and north, although the former had a larger population. This was resented in the south, which believed that the government was dominated by northerners. Additionally, the king had somewhat greater power than is the case for Dutch and Belgian monarchs today. Most notably, the ministers were responsible solely to him.

Provinces

The United Netherlands was divided into 17 provinces and the Grand Duchy of Luxembourg which was constitutionally distinct. All of these provinces can trace their origin to a medieval lordship, county, duchy or bishopric, apart from Antwerp (previously part of Duchy of Brabant) and Limburg (previously part of Prince-Bishopric of Liège and Duchy of Gelderland). Their status changed when they came under French rule, when their administration was centralised, reducing their powers. They included:

Antwerp (part of modern-day Belgium)
Drenthe (part of the Netherlands)
East Flanders (Belgium)
Friesland (Netherlands)
Gelderland (Netherlands)
Groningen (Netherlands)
Hainaut (Belgium)
Holland (Netherlands)
Limburg (split between Belgium and the Netherlands)
Liège (Belgium)
Namur (Belgium)
North Brabant (Netherlands)
Overijssel (Netherlands)
South Brabant (Belgium)
Utrecht (Netherlands)
West Flanders (Belgium)
Zeeland (Netherlands)

The United Netherlands was also a colonial power with overseas colonies in the East Indies and elsewhere.

Economic policy

Economically, the United Netherlands prospered. Supported by the state, the Industrial Revolution began to affect the Southern Netherlands where a number of modern industries emerged, encouraged by figures such as John Cockerill who created the steel industry in Wallonia. Antwerp emerged as major trading port.

William I actively supported economic modernisation. Modern universities were established in Leuven, in Liège, and in Ghent in 1817. Lower education was also extended. The General Netherlands Society for Advancing National Industry (Algemeene Nederlandsche Maatschappij ter Begunstiging van de Volksvlijt) was created in 1822 to encourage industrialisation in the south, while the Netherlands Trading Society (Nederlandsche Handel-Maatschappij) was created in 1825 to encourage trade with the colonies. William I also embarked on a program of canal building that saw the creation of the North Holland, Ghent–Terneuzen and Brussels–Charleroi canals.

Language policy 
Willem I felt that one nation must have one language and began a policy of Dutchification in politics and education. In the southern provinces of Antwerp, East-, West-Flanders, Limburg (1819), and the bilingual South Brabant (1823); Dutch was made the sole official language. While in the Walloon provinces of Hainaut, Liège, Namur; French was maintained as official language but Dutch was gradually introduced into education. Although French was still used to some degree in administration in both North and South. In the Grand Duchy of Luxembourg, French was the de facto official language while German was used in education.

Regional tensions
Differences between Southern and Northern Netherlands were never totally resolved. The two were divided by the issue of religion because the south was strongly Roman Catholic and the north largely Dutch Reformed. The Catholic Church in Belgium resented the state's encroachment on its traditional privileges, especially in education. In French-speaking parts of the south, attempts to enforce the use of Dutch language were particularly resented among the elite. Many Belgians believed that the United Netherlands' constitution discriminated against them. Though they represented 62 percent of the population, they were only allocated 50 percent of the seats in the House and less in the Senate while the state extracted money from the richer south to subsidise the north. By the mid-1820s, a union of opposition had formed in Belgium, uniting liberals and Catholic conservatives against Dutch rule.

Belgian Revolution and secession

The Belgian Revolution broke out on 25 August 1830, inspired by the recent July Revolution in France. A military intervention in September failed to defeat the rebels in Brussels, radicalising the movement. Belgium was declared an independent state on 4 October 1830. A constitutional monarchy was established under King Leopold I.

William I refused to accept the secession of Belgium. In August 1831, he launched the Ten Days' Campaign, a major military offensive into Belgium. Though initially successful, the French intervened to support the Belgians and the invasion had to be abandoned. After a period of tension, a settlement was agreed at the Treaty of London in 1839. The Dutch recognised Belgian independence, in exchange for territorial concessions. The frontier between the two countries was finally fixed by the Treaty of Maastricht in 1843. Luxembourg became an autonomous state in personal union with the Dutch, though ceding some territory to Belgium.

See also

Orangism (Belgium)
Belgium–Netherlands relations
Benelux Union
Southern Netherlands

References

Bibliography

External links
 

 
United Kingdom of the Netherlands
Former monarchies of Europe
States and territories established in 1815
States and territories disestablished in 1839